Ferdinand von Wright (19 March 1822, Haminalahti, near Kuopio - 31 July 1906, Kuopio) was a Finnish painter (belonging to Swedish-speaking population of Finland) - He is best known for his landscapes and animal paintings, especially his detailed depictions of birds, but he also created still-lifes and portraits.

Biography

Ferdinand von Wright was born  at the village of Haminalahti in Kuopio, Finland. His ancestors included Scottish merchants who had settled in Narva during the 17th-Century. His father Henrik Magnus von Wright was a retired Major who owned the family estate, Haminalahden. He was the youngest of nine surviving children and was tutored at home. Two of his older brothers, Magnus von Wright (1805–1868) and Wilhelm von Wright (1810–1887), also became painters and illustrators. Following in their footsteps, he showed an early aptitude for art, developed during time spent hunting and exploring nature while making sketchbooks.

He travelled to Sweden for the first time when he was fifteen, visiting Bohuslän Province with Wilhelm, who was working as an illustrator for the zoologist Bengt Fredrik Fries (1799–1839).

The following year, he went by himself to work for the Swedish amateur ornithologist, Count Nils Bonde, who had recently subsidized the publication of the multi-volume Svenska Fåglar (Stockholm:  C. von Scheele. 1828), with illustrations by Magnus and Wilhelm.

After a few months back in Finland, he returned to Sweden where, in 1842, he briefly studied at the Royal Swedish Academy of Arts with the sculptor Johan Niclas Byström (1783–1848). He went home again in 1844, having been in Sweden for almost six years. Five years later, he went to Turku, where he took some additional lessons from Robert Wilhelm Ekman (1808-1873).

In 1852, he and his brothers went to Helsinki, where he set up a studio and began painting more detailed scenes, rather than individual animals. Six years later, he took a trip to Dresden, where he spent two months studying with the noted animal painter Johann Siegwald Dahl (1827-1902). He then travelled to the Swedish island of Orust with Wilhelm, staying for a year.

In 1863, he built a home near his family's estate, which he named "Lugnet" . He lived there for the next twenty years, occasionally spending time with his sisters in Kuopio. In the early 1870s, he had several strokes and was often bedridden, but continued to paint as much as possible. Eventually, he had to move out of the main part of his home and occupy two smaller guest rooms upstairs. He made his last trip in 1881, to Orust, visiting Wilhelm, who was also ill.

His work became more commercial after this and, in 1886 he produced his best-known painting titled The Fighting Capercaillies. In 2006 it got third place in a public vote organized by Ateneum for Finland's "national painting", and in a similar 2013 vote held by Nordic Moneta it was again voted third most significant.

He also contributed articles to various ornithological journals. About this time, he received a state artists' pension. Many former students came to visit and, in the late 1890s, the bird painter  (1873–1953) stayed on to be his pupil and assistant. Slowly, he became more withdrawn and died in 1906.

Selected paintings

See also
Art in Finland
Golden Age of Finnish Art

References

Further reading
 Anto Leikola, Juhani Lokki and Torsten Stjernberg: 
Von Wright -veljesten linnut (“The Birds of the von Wright Brothers”). Otava, 2003. 
Taiteilijaveljekset von Wright: Suomen kauneimmat lintumaalaukset (“The Artist Brothers von Wright: Finland's Most Beautiful Bird Paintings”). Otava, 1986. 
Wilhelm & Ferdinand von Wright dagböcker (journals). Svenska litteratursällskapet i Finland, 2008.

External links 

 More paintings and drawings by Ferdinand von Wright @ the Kansallis Galleria
 Von Wright's paintings of mallards, a video @ Kantti.net
 "Cultural Path in the Landscape of the Von Wright Brothers"

1822 births
1906 deaths
People from Kuopio
People from the Grand Duchy of Finland
Swedish-speaking Finns
Finnish people of Scottish descent
19th-century Finnish nobility
Animal artists
Birds in art
19th-century Finnish painters
Finnish male painters
19th-century Finnish male artists